Kyllini, Cyllene or Kyllene (ancient Greek: Κυλλήνη) may refer to:

Mount Kyllini, a mountain in Corinthia, Peloponnese, Greece
Cyllene, an oread associated with the mountain
Kyllini, Elis, a town in Elis, Greece
Cyllene (Elis), a town of ancient Elis, Greece
Kyllene (Aeolis), a town of ancient Aeolis, now in Turkey
Kastro-Kyllini, a municipal unit in Elis, Greece
Andravida-Kyllini, a municipality in Elis, Greece 
 Cyllene (moon), a moon of Jupiter
 Cyllene (horse), a champion thoroughbred racehorse and sire
 Cyllene (gastropod), a genus of sea snails